Qaradolaq may refer to:
Qaradolaq, Aghjabadi, Azerbaijan
Qaradolaq, Qakh, Azerbaijan